Little Shuswap Lake is a small lake in the Thompson River basin of the southern Interior of British Columbia, Canada, which sits at the transition between the Thompson Country to the west and the Shuswap Country to the east. It is fed by the Little River, which flows from Shuswap Lake, and is the main source of water for the South Thompson River, which begins at the lake's outlet at its southwestern end.

The recreational and Secwepemc First Nations community of Chase (known as Quaaout in the Secwepemc language) is at the lake's southern end.  The smaller community of Squilax lies at the lake's northern end, on the north side of the estuary of the Little River.  The TransCanada Highway and Canadian Pacific Railway run along the lake's eastern shore.

See also
Little Shuswap Indian Band

References 

Shuswap Country
Thompson Country
Lakes of British Columbia
Kamloops Division Yale Land District